Count Francesco Marone Cinzano (born 1959) is an Italian businessman. A wine personality, he is known for owning Col d'Orcia, Erasmo, and formerly the Cinzano Glass.

References

1959 births
Living people
Italian winemakers